Newell Whitney Kimball (March 27, 1915 – March 22, 2001) was an American right-handed pitcher in Major League Baseball.

After attending Santa Monica High School in Southern California, he was signed by the Chicago Cubs in 1934, winning twenty games for their Class C Ponca City Angels affiliate as a nineteen-year-old. He worked his way up the Cubs chain, eventually being called up late in both the 1937 and 1938 seasons, before Chicago returned him to the minors in 1939. In 1940, the Cubs dealt Kimball to the Brooklyn Dodgers, who used him mainly in relief through 1943. He would appear in two games for the St. Louis Cardinals in 1940 and a partial season for the 1943 Philadelphia Phillies before heading back to the Pacific Coast League.

After three seasons with the PCL Hollywood Stars, Kimball was hired by the Boston Braves in 1947 to manage their new Class D club, the Las Vegas Wranglers. The club finished third in the six-team Sunset League, and Kimball (despite a 14–5 record on the mound and a .361 batting average), was let go as both player and manager at season's end. Taking a liking to Las Vegas, he stayed in town and took over the helm for the 1951 Wranglers, now playing in the Southwest International League. After a 72–71 finish, Kimball left professional baseball after a 15-year career.

Kimball died in Las Vegas in 2001, just a few days shy of his 86th birthday.

References

External links

Photo

1915 births
2001 deaths
Baseball players from Utah
Birmingham Barons players
Brooklyn Dodgers players
Chicago Cubs players
Hollywood Stars players
Las Vegas Wranglers (baseball) players
Los Angeles Angels (minor league) players
Major League Baseball pitchers
Milwaukee Brewers (minor league) players
Minor league baseball managers
Montreal Royals players
People from Las Vegas
People from Logan, Utah
Philadelphia Phillies players
Ponca City Angels players
St. Louis Cardinals players
Sportspeople from Santa Monica, California
Tulsa Oilers (baseball) players